A432 may refer to:

 A432 motorway (France)
 A432 road (England)
 EML Tasuja (A432), a ship
 A432, an alternative pitch standard; see Concert pitch#19th- and 20th-century standards